An ochrea (Latin ocrea, greave or protective legging), also spelled ocrea, is a plant structure formed of stipules fused into a sheath surrounding the stem, and is typically found in the Polygonaceae. 

In palms it denotes an extension of the leaf sheath beyond the petiole insertion.

References

Plant morphology